Kentucky Route 610 (KY 610) is a  state highway in Pike County, Kentucky, that runs from KY 805 at Dorton to KY 122 northwest of Virgie via Myra, Jonancy, Ellwood, and Virgie.

Major intersections

References

0610
Transportation in Pike County, Kentucky